An Uncertain Season is a 1988 Czechoslovak comedy film directed by Ladislav Smoljak and Zdeněk Svěrák from 1988, which depicts the struggles of a small amateur theatre company as it prepares a new play and tries to get it officially approved. The plot is based on the authentic experiences of the Jára Cimrman Theatre, features its actors and contains real excerpts from his plays, but Cimrman's name does not appear once (at most he is referred to as "The Master").

The entire film takes place in the Solidarita Theatre, the actual location of the Jára Cimrman Theatre at the time. Virtually the entire film was shot without post-synchronous sound. This gives it a documentary character.

External links
 

1988 comedy films
1988 films
Czechoslovak comedy films
Films directed by Ladislav Smoljak
Films with screenplays by Zdeněk Svěrák
Czech comedy films
1980s Czech films